The men's decathlon event at the 2003 Asian Athletics Championships was held in Manila, Philippines on September 22–23.

Results

References

2003 Asian Athletics Championships
Combined events at the Asian Athletics Championships